Oei Liana (born 30 November 1952) is an American former swimmer of Chinese Indonesian background who represented the Republic of China (Taiwan) in international competition. She competed in six events at the 1968 Summer Olympics.

Oei is from New Rochelle, New York, and took swimming lessons at the Catholic Youth Organization in Yonkers.

References

External links
 

1952 births
Living people
American female swimmers
Olympic swimmers of Taiwan
Swimmers at the 1968 Summer Olympics
Sportspeople from New Rochelle, New York
American people of Chinese-Indonesian descent
Indonesian people of Chinese descent
21st-century American women